The Namaqua rock rat (Aethomys namaquensis) is a species of rodent in the family Muridae.  It is sometimes included in the genus Micaelamys.
It is found in Angola, Botswana, Lesotho, Malawi, Mozambique, Namibia, South Africa, Eswatini, Zambia, and Zimbabwe.
Its natural habitats are temperate forest, dry savanna, temperate shrubland, subtropical or tropical dry shrubland, temperate grassland, rocky areas, hot desert, temperate desert, rocky shores, arable land, rural gardens, and urban areas.

Parasites include the chigger species: Afropolonia tgifi, Gahrliepia nana, Acomatacarus thallomyia, Hyracarus lawrencei, Herpetacarus aethomys, Herpetacarus longispinus, and Zumptrombicula misonnei.

References

Rodents of Africa
Aethomys
Mammals described in 1934
Taxonomy articles created by Polbot
Taxobox binomials not recognized by IUCN